The St. Clair Catholic District School Board (SCCDSB, known as English-language Separate District School Board No. 39 prior to 1999) is the separate school board that manages Catholic education in the county of Lambton including the city of Sarnia as well as in the regional municipality of Chatham-Kent, in southern Ontario, Canada.

The Board manages 26 elementary schools and 2 secondary or high schools. 

Elementary schools 

The secondary schools are:

St. Patrick's Catholic High School in Sarnia
Ursuline College in Chatham

The Board was formed by an amalgamation of the Lambton County Roman Catholic Separate School Board and Kent County Roman Catholic Separate School Board, which took place in 1999.

See also
Lambton Kent District School Board
List of school districts in Ontario
List of high schools in Ontario

References

Roman Catholic school districts in Ontario
Education in Sarnia
Education in Chatham-Kent